Igüeña is a village and municipality located in the region of El Bierzo (province of León, Castile and León, Spain).

Population 
According to the 2010 census (INE), Igüeña's population was 1,424 (728 males and 696 females).

Villages 
Igüeña's municipality has ten villages, two of which are uninhabited (Astur-Leonese / Spanish):
 Almagarinos 
 Colinas / Colinas del Campo de Martín Moro
 Espina / Espina de Tremor 
 Igüeña
 Puebladura / Pobladura de las Regueras
 Quintana de Fuseiros / Quintana de Fuseros
 Rodrigatos / Rodrigatos de las Regueras
 Tremor d'Arriba / Tremor de Arriba
 Los Montes / Los Montes de la Ermita (uninhabited)
 Urdiales / Urdiales de Colinas (uninhabited)

References

Municipalities in El Bierzo
Populated places in the Province of León